The Regina Saskatchewan Temple is the 65th operating temple of the Church of Jesus Christ of Latter-day Saints (LDS Church). It is located in East Regina on Wascana Creek close to the University of Regina but well away from the downtown business district in Regina, Saskatchewan, Canada.

History

On November 14, 1998, Hugh W. Pinnock broke ground on Canada's third temple.

Because of issues with transportation, LDS Church president Gordon B. Hinckley's dedication of the Halifax Nova Scotia Temple was delayed a day. Hinckley decided to go ahead with the dedication of the Halifax temple and apostle Boyd K. Packer was sent to dedicate the Regina temple. It was the first time two temples were dedicated the same day, and the first time since the dedication of the Manti Utah Temple in 1888 by Lorenzo Snow that a temple had been dedicated by a person who was not a member of the church's First Presidency.

Because of a truckers' strike, materials had not arrived until a few days before. Crews worked around the clock to finish the light grey granite facing, completing the exterior the night before the dedication.

Sidney C Paulson, from Holladay, Utah died unexpectedly on October 12, 2018, while serving as president of the Regina Saskatchewan Temple.

In 2020, the Regina Saskatchewan Temple was closed in response to the coronavirus pandemic.

See also

 List of temples of The Church of Jesus Christ of Latter-day Saints
 List of temples of The Church of Jesus Christ of Latter-day Saints by geographic region
 Comparison of temples of The Church of Jesus Christ of Latter-day Saints
 Temple architecture (Latter-day Saints)
 The Church of Jesus Christ of Latter-day Saints in Canada

Additional reading

References

External links
Regina Saskatchewan Temple Official site
Regina Saskatchewan Temple at ChurchofJesusChristTemples.org

Temples (LDS Church) completed in 1999
Buildings and structures in Regina, Saskatchewan
Religious buildings and structures in Saskatchewan
Temples (LDS Church) in Canada
20th-century Latter Day Saint temples
1999 establishments in Saskatchewan
20th-century religious buildings and structures in Canada